John Walker Scovil (January 11, 1869 – May 20, 1953) was a Canadian politician. He served in the Legislative Assembly of New Brunswick from 1921 to 1925 as member of the Liberal party. He died in 1953, aged 84.

References 

1869 births
1953 deaths
New Brunswick Liberal Association MLAs